Francisco Cárdenas Martínez also known as Pancho Cárdenas is a Mexican artist. He was born in Iztapalapa, east of Mexico City.

He is noted for his statue of Pope John Paul II with Our Lady of Guadalupe, made entirely with keys donated by Mexicans to symbolize that they had given him the keys to their hearts. His other works include the mural that surrounds the garden in Iztapalapa, depicting the history and the origin of the Mexican people.

References

Living people
Mexican artists
Year of birth missing (living people)